Dichromorpha viridis, the short-winged green grasshopper, is a common species of slant-faced grasshoppers found in North America.

This grasshopper, as the common name suggests, is mostly green coloured with a face that slants dorsally. The female of the species, however, is typically brown, and usually much larger than the male.

References

External links
Short-winged Grasshopper (Dichromorpha viridis), Wisconsin DNR
Grasshoppers genus Dichromorpha, PBase

Gomphocerinae
Insects described in 1863